The Eubacteriaceae are a family of Gram-positive bacteria in the order Clostridiales.

Phylogeny
The currently accepted taxonomy based on the List of Prokaryotic names with Standing in Nomenclature (LPSN) and the National Center for Biotechnology Information (NCBI).

See also 
 List of bacterial orders
 List of bacteria genera

References

External links